Serhiy Shurkhal is a retired Ukrainian professional footballer who played as a midfielder.

Career
Serhiy Shurkhal, started his career with Avanhard Koryukivka and then in 1999 he moved to Desna Chernihiv the main club of Chernihiv. In 2001 he moved to Yevropa Pryluky where he played 5 matches, before playing 5 matches for Kherson. In summer 2002, he moved back to Desna Chernihiv in Ukrainian Second League where in the season 2002–03 he played 7 matches, where he managed to get third place.In January 2003, he moved to Sokil Zolochiv in the Ukrainian First League where he managed to play one match in the 2002–03 season.

References

External links 
 Sergey Shurkhal at footballfacts.ru

1980 births
Living people
Footballers from Chernihiv
FC Desna Chernihiv players
FC Krystal Kherson players
FC Sokil Zolochiv players
Ukrainian footballers
Ukrainian Premier League players
Ukrainian First League players
Ukrainian Second League players
Association football midfielders